The Lydia Darrah School is an historic school building which is located in the Francisville neighborhood of Philadelphia, Pennsylvania.
 
It was added to the National Register of Historic Places in 1986.

=History and architectural feature
Designed by Irwin T. Catharine, this historic structure was built between 1926 and 1927. It is a three-story, rectangular, brick building with a raised basement, which was created in the Moderne-style. It features terracotta trim, fluted columns, and an undulating parapet wall.  It was named for Revolutionary War figure Lydia Darrah (1728-1789).

It was added to the National Register of Historic Places in 1986.

References

School buildings on the National Register of Historic Places in Philadelphia
Moderne architecture in Pennsylvania
School buildings completed in 1927
Lower North Philadelphia
1927 establishments in Pennsylvania